John Travis is a London-born record producer, producer, audio engineer, mixer and songwriter whose work has been primarily based in New York and Los Angeles, California since 1998.

His history includes work with such artists as Kid Rock, Social Distortion, Static-X, Buckcherry, Suicide Silence, the Answer, Twin Atlantic, No Doubt and Sugar Ray.

References

External links
 Official website

English record producers
Living people
Year of birth missing (living people)
People from London
English expatriates in the United States
English songwriters